(b. 634, in Katsuragi (modern Nara Prefecture); d. c. 700–707) was a Japanese ascetic and mystic, traditionally held to be the founder of Shugendō, the path of ascetic training practiced by the gyōja or yamabushi.

He was banished by the Imperial Court to Izu Ōshima on June 26, 699, but folk tales at least as old as the Nihon Ryōiki (c. 800) recount his supernatural powers and exploits.

Historical references
Even historical accounts of his life are intermixed with legends and folklore. According to the chronicle Shoku Nihongi (797 AD), En no Ozunu  was banished to the island of Izu Ōshima on June 26, 699:

On hinoto-ushi (sexagenary "fire ox") day [24th day of the 5th month, Mommu 3 (June 26, 699 AD)], En no Kimi Ozunu was banished to  Izu no Shima. Ozunu had first lived in Mount Katsuragi and been acclaimed for his sorcery and was the teacher of Outer Junior 5th Rank Lower Grade . Later, [a person (or Hirotari?)] envied his power and accused him of trickery with his weird magic. [The Imperial Court] banished him far [from the Capital]. Rumor says, "Ozunu was able to manipulate demonic spirits, making them draw water and gather firewood. When they disobeyed, he bound them using sorcery."

In the religion Shugendō

In folk religion, En no Ozunu is traditionally held to be the founder of Shugendō, a syncretic religion incorporating aspects of Taoism, Shinto, esoteric Buddhism (especially Shingon Mikkyō and the Tendai sect) and traditional Japanese shamanism.

En no Gyōja was conferred the posthumous title Jinben Daibosatsu (Great Bodhisattva Jinben, 神変大菩薩) at a ceremony held in 1799 to commemorate the one-thousandth year of his passing. Authorship of the non-canonical Sutra on the Unlimited Life of the Threefold Body is attributed to En no Gyōja. Due to his mythical status as a mountain saint, he was believed to possess many supernatural powers.

In popular culture

 In Kyoto's Gion Festival, one of the yamaboko floats (En no Gyoja Yama) is dedicated to En no Gyoja. It is an annual pilgrimage destination for yamabushi (practitioners of Shugendo), who perform various rituals on site. 
 In the historical fantasy novel Teito Monogatari by Hiroshi Aramata the protagonist Yasunori Kato claims to be a descendant of En no Gyōja.  
In the manga OZN by Shiro Ohno the protagonist is a superheroic version of En no Ozunu.  
In the SNES game Shin Megami Tensei, an NPC named En-no-ozuno resides in Kongokai.
In the PS1 game Oni Zero: Fukkatsu, the main antagonist is En no Gyōja.
In Koji Suzuki's novel Ring, Sadako's mother drags a statuette of En no Ozunu from the sea.
In the movie "Ninja Assassin," the antagonist is 'Master Ozunu;' who heads the, "9 Clan".
In the anime Zenki, a posthumous character named Enno Ozunu was the master of Zenki, who would centuries later be summoned again by his descendant, Chiaki Enno.
The manga Touge Oni tells the tale of En no Ozuno and his two disciples, Zenki and Miyo (later Goki), traveling the land of Wa meeting various Kami.

Explanatory notes

References

Citations

Bibliography

: v.1, v. 2

External links
En no Ozunu - History of Japan Database

Founders of religions
Japanese religious leaders
Japanese writers
Apothecaries
Shugendō practitioners
Japanese exorcists